Kameshwar Singh Darbhanga Sanskrit University (KSDSU) is a state university located at Darbhanga, Bihar, India, dedicated to the teaching and promotion of Sanskrit.

History

KSDSU was established in 1961, with the scholar Umesh Mishra as its first Vice-Chancellor. The then Education Minister of unified  Bihar, Satyendra Narayan Sinha, announced the instigation of the university. Kameshwar Singh donated his ancestral Anand Bagh Palace to the government of Bihar as a university for the promotion of Sanskrit. Currently, this palace is the head office of the university.

It has held one awareness campaign. Sanskrit scholar and poet Ram Karan Sharma was the vice chancellor from 1974 to 1980.

Campus
Kameshwar Singh Darbhanga Sanskrit University is located in Laxmishwar Vilas Palace, also known as Anand Bag in Darbhanga.

See also
List of Sanskrit universities in India
 Sidheshwari Laxminath Sanskrit College

References

External Links
 

Sanskrit universities in India
Universities in Bihar
Education in Darbhanga
Educational institutions established in 1961
1961 establishments in Bihar